CIYM-FM is a Canadian radio station that broadcasts a classic hits format at 100.9 FM in Brighton, Ontario.

Owned by My Broadcasting Corporation, the station was authorized on May 15, 2009 and began broadcasting later in the same year originally with an adult contemporary format branded as 100.9 myFM.

On May 20, 2016, The station switched to oldies branded as Oldies 100.9.

References

External links

 

Iym
Iym
Radio stations established in 2009
2009 establishments in Ontario
IYM